Grange League may refer to:

 American Football League (1926)
 Agway